Kalmanto is the fifth studio album by the Finnish dark metal band Ajattara. It was released in 2007 on Spikefarm Records.

Track listing

Personnel
 Ruoja - vocals, guitars, producer, cover art (painting)
 Tohtori Kuolio - bass, backing vocals
 Malakias IV - drums
 Raajat - keyboards, backing vocals
 Kalmos - guitars, backing vocals

Additional personnel and staff
 Saasta - backing vocals on "Alttarilla aamutähden"
 Annas - female vocals
 Saattaja - female vocals
 Pastori Tenoxi - recording
 Minerva Pappi - mastering
 Kalle Pyyhtinen - cover art

External links
 Kalmanto at Allmusic

2007 albums
Ajattara albums